François V de Beauharnais (16 January 1714, La Rochelle – 18 June 1800, Saint-Germain-en-Laye) was a French nobleman, soldier, politician, colonial governor and admiral. He was seigneur de Beaumont et de Bellechauve, baron de Beauville, 1st marquis de la Ferté-Beauharnais, chef d'escadre des armées royales, and governor of the French colony of Martinique. He was the son of Claude de Beauharnais (1680–1738), sieur de Beaumont et de Bellechauve, and his wife Renée Hardouineau.

Marriages and issue
On 13 September 1751, at Blois, François de Beauharnais married Marie Anne Henriette Françoise Pyvart de Chastullé (1722–1767). They had three children: 
 François de Beauharnais (1752–1753)
 François de Beauharnais (VI) (1756–1846), seigneur de Beaumont et de Bellechauve, baron de Beauville, 3rd comte des Roches-Baritaud, 2nd marquis de la Ferté-Beauharnais
 Alexandre de Beauharnais (1760–1794).

On Henriette's death, François de Beauharnais in 1796 married Désirée Eugénie Tascher de La Pagerie (1739–1803).

Life
In 1751, he was made chef d'escadre des vaisseaux du roi, then governor of Martinique. On 20 April 1752, he acquired the château de La Ferté-Avrain, which had recently been rebuilt. In recognition of his services to France, on 7 July 1764 Louis XV promoted him to the status of marquis, allowing him to raise his lands at La Ferté-Avrain into the marquisat. From then on, La Ferté-Avrain was called La Ferté-Beauharnais after him.

Genealogy
François V de Beauharnais is the ancestor of Nicolas of Leuchtenberg, Napoleon III and the current royal houses of Norway, Sweden, Denmark, Luxembourg, and Belgium through Josephine of Leuchtenberg, later Queen of Sweden.

External links
 web.genealogie.free.fr
 www.geneall.net
 www.graphs.1901.org

1714 births
1800 deaths
Francis 05
French Governors of Martinique
Governors general of the French Antilles